This is a comparison of BitTorrent websites that includes most of the most popular sites. These sites typically contain multiple torrent files and an index of those files.

Features 
BitTorrent sites may operate a BitTorrent tracker and are often referred to as such.  Operating a tracker should not be confused with hosting content.
A directory allows users to browse the content available on a website based on various categories. A directory is also a site where users can find other websites.
BitTorrent sites may either focus on certain content — such as etree that focuses on live concerts— or may have no particular focus, like The Pirate Bay. Some sites specialize as search engines of other BitTorrent sites.

Google downranking 
In October 2014, Google Search results were affected by anti-piracy algorithms, which includes downranking popular BitTorrent sites in search results. The algorithm works when Google users search for movie, music or software titles in combination with terms such as "download", "watch" and "torrent". Popular BitTorrent sites are demoted in the list; the traffic reduction depends on the site, but some sites experienced nearly a 50% reduction in visitors.

Site comparison 

The following table compares the features of some of the most popular BitTorrent websites; it is not comprehensive with regard to listing all of the popular BitTorrent trackers, especially private trackers.

Defunct

See also 
 List of warez groups

References 

BitTorrent sites
Lists of websites